Gahnia javanica is a tussock-forming perennial in the family Cyperaceae, that is native to parts of Asia and Melanesia.

References

javanica
Plants described in 1846
Flora of China
Flora of Borneo
Flora of Indonesia
Flora of Malaysia
Flora of Papua New Guinea
Flora of the Philippines
Flora of Vietnam
Flora of Sulawesi
Flora of the Solomon Islands (archipelago)